Tomomi Hayashi (林 知充、born February 1, 1971, in Toyama, Japan) is a Japanese-Estonian architect.

From 1990 to 1994 Tomomi Hayashi studied in the Yokohama National University (横浜国立大学 Yokohama Kokuritsu Daigaku) in the department of architecture. From 1995 to 1999 he studied in the Virginia Polytechnic Institute and State University, at the Washington-Alexandria Architecture Center (WAAC).

From 1994 to 1995 Tomomi Hayashi worked in the Maki and Associates architectural bureau as an assistant. From 1999 to 2001 he worked in the Rafael Viñoly Architects architectural bureau. From 2001 to present he works in Estonia - from 2001 to 2003 in HEAD Arhitektid OÜ architectural office, in 2003 in KOSMOS OÜ architectural office and from 2004 to present in Hayashi-Grossschmidt Arhitektuur (HGA).

Most notable works of Tomomi Hayashi are the Lasnamäe track and field hall (2003), Museum of Occupations (2003), FOORUM department store (2007), the Rotermann's Old and New Flour Storage (reconstruction and extension of the Old Flour Storage in Rotermanni Quarter) (2009) as well as the renovation of Machinery Hall of the A. M. Lutheri Furniture Factory (2017). HGA was involved with the Estonian National Museum project from 2008 till its completion as the collaborating local architects.  Tomomi Hayashi has received the annual architecture prize of the Cultural Endowment of Estonia in 2003 and 2009, and in 2017 architectural grand prize for the Estonian National Museum project. He was nominated for the Mies van der Rohe Prize in 2005, 2009 and 2019.

Recently received the Gold prize in the Work category for the IFI Design Distinction Award and Special Mentions in 2020 European Heritage Awards – Europa Nostra Awards for the renovation of Machinery Hall of the A. M. Lutheri Furniture Factory.

Since 2012 he has taught at TTK, Tallinn University of Applied Sciences. Between 2012 and 2017 lead the Institute of Architecture in Faculty of Architecture and Environmental Engineering. At the same institute he teaches as an associate professor (2016-2020) and then as a professor (2021-).

Tomomi Hayashi is a member of the Union of Estonian Architects and Chartered architect-expert VIII.

Works
Exhibition Design for "Miracles in Concrete. August Komendant", Museum of Estonian Architecture, 2020 (with Andrea Ainjärv)
Noblessner Yacht Club and Noblessner Shipyard reconstruction, Tallinn, 2019 (realised as Kai Art Centre, project complemented by KAOS Architects)
Renovation of the Machinery Hall of A.M. Luther's Furniture Factory, Tallinn, 2017 (with Hanno Grossschmidt, Liis Voksepp, Marianna Zvereva, Anna Endrikson, Jüri Nigulas, Andres Ristov, Sander Treijar)
Estonian National Museum, Tartu, 2016 (Author: DGT Architects, Paris / Local architects: HGA, Tallinn) 
Installation "Paper Library", Riga, 2014
Floating Sauna, Türi, 2013
Installation "A Stair for Tallinn Archicture Biennale", Tallinn, 2013
BAUA exhibition booth in the 24th UIA Congress in Tokyo, “GLOBE” – Shape your future!, 2011 (Curatorial work, Author: Mark Grimitliht)
Installation “To the Sea” on the roof of the Tallinna Linnahall, Tallinn, 2011
Musician's House in Tallinn, 2010 (with Liis Voksepp)
ADM Interactive office, Tallinn, 2010 (with Kerli Valk, Ahti Grünberg)
Rotermann's Old and New Flour Storage -Reconstruction and extension of the Old Flour Storage in the Rotermanni Quarter, Tallinn, 2009 (with Hanno Grossschmidt, Yoko Azukawa)
Foorum department store, Tallinn, 2007 (with Hanno Grossschmidt)
Lasnamäe Track and Field Centre, Tallinn, 2003 (with Siiri Vallner, Hanno Grossschmidt)
Museum of Occupations, Tallinn, 2003 (with Siiri Vallner, Indrek Peil)
David L. Lawrence Convention Center, Pittsburgh, 2003 (with Rafael Vinóly Architects)

Competitions
The Stroomi Beach House, 2020; 1st place
The vision for the Hipodroomi Business Quarter, 2020; 1st place
Viljandi's new hospital and health centre, 2019; Honourable mention
The Commercial complex at Narva mnt 1 and Hobujaama 5, Tallinn - uniting the existing multiplex cinema and former central post office, 2017; 1st place
Regeneration of the Tallinna Kaubamaja department store, 2017; 2nd place
The vision for the Sepise Quarter vision, Tallinn, 2017; 1st place
Pärnu Port Area planning, 2016; Honourable mention
Vision for the Pirita Promenade complex, Tallinn, 2016; Shared 2nd and 3rd place
Vision for the Salutaguse Manor Field, 2015; Shared 1st place
Estonian Pavilion for the Expo 2015 in Milan, 2013; Honourable mention
Estonian History Museum Maarjamäe Complex, 2012; 2nd place
Extension of the Pärnu Sütevaka Humanitarian Gymnasium, 2012; 2nd place
Apartment building complex in Kadriorg, Tallinn, 2011; 1st place
Lift11 -Urban Installation Festival, 2010; entry selected for realisation
New building of the Estonian Public Broadcasting company, 2007; 4th place
Reconstruction and extension of the Old Flour Storage in the Rotermanni Quarter, 2005; 1st prize
Peasantry Museum in Mahtra, 2005; 1st place
Hotel Paadi, 2002; 1st place

Awards
European Heritage Awards – Europa Nostra Awards, 2020; Special mentions — The renovation of Machinery Hall of the A. M. Lutheri Furniture Factory
IFI Design Distinction Award; Gold prize, 2020, Work category — The renovation of Machinery Hall of the A. M. Lutheri Furniture Factory
Annual Prize of the Estonian Association of Interior Architects, 2018 — The renovation of Machinery Hall of the A. M. Lutheri Furniture Factory
2018 Wood Awards from the Estonian Forest and Wood Industries Association; Special Prize for Plywood Construction — The renovation of Machinery Hall of the A. M. Lutheri Furniture Factory
Excellent restoration work and interior design of 2017 from the Urban Planning Department of Tallinn — The renovation of Machinery Hall of the A. M. Lutheri Furniture Factory
Special Award from Estonian Union of Concrete, 2017 — The renovation of Machinery Hall of the A. M. Lutheri Furniture Factory
Annual Architectural Prize from the Estonian Culture Endowment, 2017 — The Estonian National Museum
Annual Architectural Prize from the Union of the Estonian architects, 2017 — The Estonian National Museum
2016 Wood Award from the Estonian Forest and Wood Industries Association; Special Prize for Plywood Construction and People's Choice Prize - Floating Saun
Private House Award 2008-2012 from the Union of the Estonian architects; Shared 2nd place — Musician's house in Tallinn
Kuldmuna 2012 Award; “Hõbemuna” (Silver Egg) prize in ambient design category - BAUA exhibition booth at UIA Congress in Tokyo 
Estonian Design Award, 2011; Silver prize in Environmental Design category - BAUA exhibition booth at UIA Congress in Tokyo
Annual Prize of the Estonian Association of Interior Architects, 2010; Best Public Interior Prize - ADM Interactive office
Annual Architectural Prize of the Estonian Culture Endowment, 2009 - Rotermann's Old and New Flour Storage
Annual Architecture prize of the Estonian Cultural Endowment, 2003 - Lasnamäe Track and Field Centre
Special Award 2003 by the Estonian Concrete Union, 2003 - Lasnamäe Track and Field Centre

References
Union of Estonian Architects, members, Tomomi Hayashi
HG Architecture OÜ, employees
Mart Kalm: Museum of Occupations
Indrek Peil, Siiri Vallner: Occupation Museum, at Toompea St, Tallinn, MAJA 3-2003
Nominees for the Mies van der Rohe Prize 2009
Website of the Lutheri Ärimaja - office building
Website of the Estonian National Museum building data

Estonian architects
1971 births
Living people
Japanese architects
Yokohama National University alumni